Thomas Vernon (by 1532 – 4 June 1556) was an English politician.

He was a Member (MP) of the Parliament of England for Shropshire in March 1553. He married Dorothy, daughter of Sir Francis Lovell of Barton Bendish and East Harling, Norfolk.

References

1556 deaths
English MPs 1553 (Edward VI)
Year of birth uncertain
Thomas